Love Sweat is the twenty-second album by Dutch hard rock band Golden Earring, released in 1995. It contains covers of other artists' songs. The album was not issued in the U.S.

Track listing
"When I Was Young" (Vic Briggs, Eric Burdon, Barry Jenkins, Danny McCulloch, John Weider) - 3:10
"Darkness, Darkness" (Jesse Colin Young) - 3:54
"Gotta See Jane" (Eddie Holland, Ronald Miller, R. Dean Taylor) - 3:15
"My Little Red Book" (Burt Bacharach, Hal David) - 2:50
"Sail on, Sailor" (Brian Wilson, Van Dyke Parks, Tandyn Almer, Ray Kennedy, Jack Rieley) - 3:19
"Motorbikin'" (Chris Spedding) - 2:55
"I'll Be Back Again" (John Lennon, Paul McCartney) - 3:37
"This Wheel's on Fire" (Rick Danko, Bob Dylan) - 4:02
"Ballad of a Thin Man" (Dylan) - 5:07
"Collage" (Patrick Cullie, Joe Walsh) - 3:36
"Move Over" (Janis Joplin) - 3:46
"Who Do You Love" (Ellas McDaniel) - 3:36
"Turn the Page" (Bob Seger) - 5:35

Personnel
George Kooymans - guitar, vocals
Rinus Gerritsen - bass guitar
Barry Hay - guitar, vocals
Cesar Zuiderwijk - drums

Charts

Weekly charts

Year-end charts

References

Golden Earring albums
1995 albums
Columbia Records albums
Covers albums